Neocheritra amrita, the grand imperial, is a butterfly in the family Lycaenidae. It is found in Burma, Thailand, Peninsular Malaysia, Singapore and on Sumatra and Borneo.

Subspecies
The following subspecies are recognised:
 Neocheritra amrita amrita (southern Burma, Thailand, Peninsular Malaya, Singapore, Sumatra)
 Neocheritra theodora theodora Druce, 1885 (Borneo)

References

Butterflies described in 1860
Iolaini
Butterflies of Singapore
Butterflies of Borneo
Taxa named by Baron Cajetan von Felder
Taxa named by Rudolf Felder
Butterflies of Asia